Menura tyawanoides is an extinct species of lyrebird from the Early Miocene of Australia. It was described by Walter Boles from fossil material (a complete left carpometacarpus) found in terrestrial limestone at the Upper Site of Riversleigh, in the Boodjamulla National Park of north-western Queensland. It was smaller than the two living species of lyrebirds. The specific epithet comes from tyawan (a Kumbainggiri term for the superb lyrebird) and the Greek suffix –oides (“resembling”).

References

Fossil taxa described in 1995
Menuridae
Miocene birds
Prehistoric birds of Australia
Riversleigh fauna
Birds described in 1995